"Horses" is a song by American rappers PnB Rock, Kodak Black, and A Boogie Wit Da Hoodie. It was released on March 31, 2017 as the fifth single from the soundtrack of the film The Fate of the Furious.

Composition
The song is about the rappers driving new cars, over a "subdued, yet catchy" beat. PnB Rock sings the chorus, while Kodak Black raps about how he drives carelessly.

Charts

Certifications

References

2017 singles
2017 songs
PnB Rock songs
Kodak Black songs
A Boogie wit da Hoodie songs
Songs written by Kodak Black
Songs written by A Boogie wit da Hoodie
Atlantic Records singles
Fast & Furious music
Songs written by PnB Rock